Peter Britton Tobin (27 August 1946 – 8 October 2022) was a Scottish convicted serial killer and sex offender who served a whole life order at HM Prison Edinburgh for three murders committed between 1991 and 2006. Police also investigated Tobin over the deaths and disappearances of other young women and girls.

Tobin served ten years in prison for the rape, buggery and indecent assault of two girls in 1993, following which he was released in 2004. Three years after his release, he was sentenced to life with a minimum of twenty-one years for the rape and murder of Angelika Kluk in Glasgow in 2006. Remains of two teenagers who went missing in 1991 were subsequently found at his former home in Margate, Kent. Tobin was convicted of the murder of Vicky Hamilton in December 2008, resulting in his minimum sentence being increased to thirty years, and of the murder of Dinah McNicol in December 2009, resulting in a whole life order.

Tobin was identified as a psychopath by a senior psychologist and it was thought he might be connected with the Bible John murders of the late 1960s, although police eventually ruled him out of the murders. Tobin reportedly claimed in prison to a psychiatrist of having murdered forty-eight people.

Early and personal life
Peter Britton Tobin was born in Johnstone, Renfrewshire, Scotland, on 27 August 1946, the youngest of eight siblings. He had four older sisters and three older brothers. Tobin was a difficult child and in 1953, aged seven, he was sent to an approved school. He reportedly joined the French Foreign Legion but later deserted. Tobin later served time in a borstal and in 1970 was convicted and imprisoned in England for burglary and forgery.

Tobin moved to Brighton, Sussex, England, where he married his 17-year-old girlfriend, Margaret Louise Robertson Mountney, a clerk and typist, in August 1969. They separated after a year and she divorced him in 1971. In 1973, Tobin married a local nurse, 30-year-old Sylvia Jefferies. The couple had a son and a daughter, the latter of whom died soon after birth. This second marriage lasted until 1976, when Sylvia left with their son. Tobin then had a relationship with Cathy Wilson; the couple married in 1989, with a son born later that year. In 1990, they moved to Bathgate, West Lothian, Scotland. Wilson left Tobin in 1990 and moved back to Portsmouth, Hampshire, England, where she had grown up. All three wives later gave similar accounts of falling for a charming, well-dressed psychopath who turned violent and displayed a sadistic streak during their marriages. In May 1991, Tobin moved to Margate, Kent, and, in 1993, to Havant, Hampshire, to be near his younger son.

Convictions

Rape, buggery and indecent assault of two girls
On 4 August 1993, Tobin attacked two 14-year-old girls at his flat in Leigh Park, Havant, after they went to visit a neighbour who was not at home. They stopped at Tobin's flat and asked if they could wait there. After holding them at knife-point and forcing them to drink strong cider and vodka, Tobin sexually assaulted and raped the girls, stabbing one of them whilst his younger son was present. He then turned on the gas cooker without lighting it and left them for dead, but they both survived the attack. To avoid arrest, Tobin went into hiding and joined the Jesus Fellowship, a religious sect in Coventry, under a false name. He was later captured in Brighton after his blue Austin Metro car was found there.

On 18 May 1994, at Winchester Crown Court, Tobin entered a plea of guilty and received a fourteen-year prison sentence. In 2004, Tobin, then 58 years old, was released from prison and returned to Paisley in Renfrewshire.

Angelika Kluk murder
In September 2006, Tobin was working as a church handyman at St Patrick's Church in Anderston, Glasgow. He had assumed the name of Pat McLaughlin to avoid detection, as he was still on the Violent and Sex Offender Register following his 1994 convictions for rape and assault. An arrest warrant had been issued for Tobin in November 2005 after he moved from Paisley without notifying the police, but he was not discovered until he became a suspect in Angelika Kluk's murder at the church. In May 2007, he received a further thirty-month sentence for breaching the terms of the register.

Kluk, a 23-year-old student from Poland, was staying at the presbytery of St Patrick's Church, where she worked as a cleaner to help finance her Scandinavian studies course at the University of Gdańsk. She was last seen alive in the company of Tobin on 24 September 2006, and is thought to have been attacked by him in the garage attached to the presbytery. Kluk was beaten, raped and stabbed, and her body was concealed in an underground chamber beneath the floor near the confessional in the church. Forensic evidence suggested that she was still alive when she was placed under the floorboards. Police found her body on 29 September, and Tobin was arrested in London shortly afterwards. He had been admitted to hospital under a false name, and with a fictitious complaint.

A six-week trial resulted from the evidence gathered under the supervision of Detective Superintendent David Swindle of Strathclyde Police, and took place at the High Court of Justiciary in Edinburgh, between 23 March and 4 May 2007. The trial judge was Lord Menzies, the prosecution was led by Advocate Depute Dorothy Bain, and the defence by Donald Findlay QC. Tobin was found guilty of raping and murdering Kluk and was sentenced to life imprisonment, to serve a minimum of twenty-one years. In sentencing Tobin, Judge Lord Menzies described him as "an evil man".

Vicky Hamilton murder
In June 2007, Tobin's former house in Bathgate was searched in connection with the disappearance of 15-year-old Vicky Hamilton, who was last seen on 10 February 1991 as she waited for a bus home to Redding, near Falkirk. Tobin is believed to have left Bathgate for Margate a few weeks after her disappearance. On 21 July 2007, Lothian and Borders Police released a statement that they had "arrested, cautioned and charged a male in connection with the matter and a report has been submitted to the Procurator Fiscal", but did not immediately confirm the identity of the man arrested.

The investigation later led to a forensic search of a house in Southsea in early October 2007, where Tobin is believed to have lived shortly after leaving Bathgate. On 14 November 2007, Lothian and Borders Police confirmed that human remains found in the back garden of 50 Irvine Drive, a house in Margate occupied by Tobin in 1991, were those of Hamilton.

In November 2008, Tobin was tried at the High Court in Dundee for Hamilton's murder. He was again defended by Donald Findlay, while the prosecution was led by the Solicitor General for Scotland, Frank Mulholland QC. The prosecution case went beyond the circumstantial evidence of Tobin having lived at the two houses in Bathgate and Margate in 1991, and consisted of eyewitness testimony of suspicious behaviour by Tobin in Bathgate, evidence to destroy his alibi, and DNA and fingerprints left on a dagger found in his former house, on Hamilton's purse and on the sheeting in which her body was wrapped.

After a month-long trial, Tobin was convicted of Hamilton's murder on 2 December 2008. When sentencing Tobin to life imprisonment, the judge said:You stand convicted of the truly evil abduction and murder of a vulnerable young girl in 1991 and thereafter of attempting to defeat the ends of justice in various ways over an extended period... Yet again you have shown yourself to be unfit to live in a decent society. It is hard for me to convey the loathing and revulsion that ordinary people will feel for what you have done... I fix the minimum period which you must spend in custody at 30 years. Had it been open to me I would have made that period run consecutive to the 21-year custodial period that you are already serving.

On 11 December 2008, Tobin gave notice to court officials that he intended to challenge the verdict and overturn the sentence imposed on him. The appeal was dropped in March 2009.

Dinah McNicol murder
Dinah McNicol, an 18-year-old sixth former from Tillingham, Essex, was last seen alive on 5 August 1991, hitchhiking home with a male friend from a music festival in Liphook, Hampshire. While hitchhiking, they accepted a lift from a male subject. Her friend was dropped off at Junction 8 of the M25, near Reigate, while McNicol stayed in the car with the driver. She was never seen again. After her disappearance, regular withdrawals were made from her building society account at cash machines in Hampshire and Sussex, out of character for McNicol, who had told friends and family that she intended to use the money to travel or further her education.

In late 2007, Essex Police reopened the investigation into McNicol's disappearance, following new leads. On 16 November 2007, a second body was found at 50 Irvine Drive in Margate, later confirmed by police to be that of McNicol. On 1 September 2008, the Crown Prosecution Service served a summons on Tobin's solicitors, accusing him of her murder. This new trial began in June 2009, but was postponed and the jury discharged in the following month after the judge ruled that Tobin was not fit to stand trial pending surgery.

The case resumed on 14 December 2009 at Chelmsford Crown Court. On 16 December, after the defence had offered no evidence, a jury found Tobin guilty of McNicol's murder after deliberating for less than fifteen minutes, and Tobin subsequently received his third life sentence.

Operation Anagram
Operation Anagram was a nationwide police investigation into Tobin's life and movements. The investigation started in 2006, after his first murder conviction, led by DSI Swindle of Strathclyde Police, and increased in intensity in December 2009 after Tobin's third conviction. It aimed to trace Tobin's past movements and possible involvement in thirteen unsolved murders, including the three victims of the unidentified killer Bible John. Tobin is reported to have claimed forty-eight victims in boasts made in prison. Through the HOLMES 2 database, police forces across the UK were involved in the operation, investigating the possibility of Tobin's connection to dozens of murders and disappearances of teenage girls and young women.

Swindle, speaking after Tobin's 2006 conviction for the murder of Kluk, said that Tobin's age and the method of the murder sparked speculation that he may be a serial killer, as did interviews with Tobin. Anagram led to the discovery of the bodies of Hamilton and McNicol. It is believed that , detectives across the UK were following up on up to 1,400 lines of inquiry. As part of their renewed inquiries, police were especially interested in tracing the owners of jewellery items found at his residences. In 2009, police released photographs of the thirty-two pieces of jewellery that they found which were in Tobin's possession between 1991 and 2006 which authorities believed to be mementos Tobin collected during his criminal career. In July 2010, it was reported that officers working on Operation Anagram had narrowed their review down to nine unsolved murders and disappearances. The operation was wound down in June 2011, having failed to identify any more victims.

Louise Kay investigation
Tobin was linked to the disappearance of 18-year-old Louise Kay from Beachy Head in Eastbourne during 1988. Kay was never seen again after telling a friend she was going to sleep in her car at Beachy Head after an evening with friends, something she had done previously. Neither Kay nor her gold Ford Fiesta car with a white door have ever been seen since.  Operation Anagram established that Tobin was working in a hotel in Eastbourne at the time she disappeared, and learned that he was selling a small hand-painted car after she vanished. Tobin had history working with dealing cars for an auction company, and also had links to scrapyards. It is thought Tobin could have re-painted Kay's car and then sold it on to hide his crime. Kay had met a mysterious 'Scottish man' shortly before she disappeared, and it was known that he had given her money for petrol for her car. Kay's case was featured on Crimewatch in 1994.

Swindle stated in 2018 that he believes that Tobin killed Kay. Detectives investigated whether Tobin was responsible but could never prove his involvement. At the time of the disappearance, Tobin owned the property 22 Windlesham Road in Brighton; the house and its garden have never been searched for remains. Operation Anagram ordered the search of two houses that Tobin had owned in Brighton in relation to the search for Kay, 67 Station Road in Portslade and 152-154 Marine Parade in Brighton, but did not search the Windlesham Road property. Former police officer and investigator Mark Williams-Thomas stated in a documentary in 2018, part of his The Investigator: A British Crime Story series, that he believes the body of Kay is still buried in the garden of the property.

Jessie Earl investigation

The murder of 22-year-old Jessie Earl in 1980 was also reinvestigated by Operation Anagram. Earl had also disappeared from Eastbourne, and her skeletonised body was found in 1989 concealed in dense shrubland on Beachy Head, a place she would often take walks and the same place Louise Kay had vanished from in 1988. Her own bra had been tied around her hands to restrain her. As with Kay, Tobin was living in the area at the time of her murder, and was possibly working as a handyman at Holy Trinity Church in Eastbourne at the time she disappeared. 

Earl was known to have been nervous about a man she had met while previously out walking, and had reportedly described meeting a middle-aged Scottish man near the same spot her body was found. Shortly after the discovery of Earl's body became public knowledge in 1989, Tobin hurriedly moved with his wife and child a great distance to Bathgate, Scotland, without prior informing his wife of these plans, which suggested he had an underlying reason to suddenly leave the area. This was notably similar to how Tobin had suddenly moved a great distance from Bathgate to Margate in 1991, shortly after he had murdered 15-year-old Vicky Hamilton in Bathgate, which showed how Tobin had a habit of moving across the country to avoid being detected for crimes he had committed. This was further suggested to be the case in Earl's murder as Tobin was found to have checked into a hospital in Glasgow a few days after she was killed, which again fitted his habit of moving as far away as possible after committing a murder.

In 2012, criminologist David Wilson produced a documentary as part of his Killers Behind Bars: The Untold Story series, in which he made his case to support the theory that Earl was a likely victim of Tobin. In Mark Williams-Thomas's 2018 documentary on Louise Kay, he also supported the theory that Tobin could be responsible for Earl's death after linking her case to Kay's disappearance.

Other links investigated
Operation Anagram also investigated and in some cases disproved links between Tobin and other murders and disappearances, including:
 8 April 1969: April Fabb. 13-year-old Fabb disappeared while cycling between Metton, Norfolk, and Roughton, Norfolk, and has not been seen since. Although the case has also been linked to Robert Black, he had no known links to Norfolk, whereas Tobin is known to have regularly holidayed in the region. He is known to have often taken holiday trips to Norfolk on bank holidays, and Fabb vanished the day after the Easter Monday bank holiday. The date of Fabb's disappearance falls within the first and second Bible John murders. In 2009, Norfolk Police said that they had found no evidence to link Tobin to Fabb's disappearance or to any other unsolved case in the county.
 28 February 1971: Dorothea Meechan. 37-year-old housewife and nurse Dorothea Meechan disappeared on her way home to Kirlandneuk Crescent, having attended a family party. She was found six weeks later raped and strangled and her nude body partially buried in the vicinity of a bridge spanning railway tracks between Clark Street and McClue Avenue in Renfrew, where Tobin grew up.  Her clothes and handbag were missing. Richard Coubrough, who died in 2008 at the age of 74, was found guilty of Dorothea's murder on July 2, 1971. However, Coubrough denied committing the crime and always protested his innocence in the case. Tobin's former neighbours in the area were interviewed by police in 2008. 
 August 1974: Norfolk headless body. The decapitated body of an unknown woman, believed to have been killed in early August, was found wrapped in a sheet near Swaffham, Norfolk, on 27 August 1974. The woman was never identified but the sheet she was wrapped in was found to have been one of only six sheets sold by a Scottish company between 1962 and 1968, a period when Tobin was known to be living in Glasgow. Tobin had also used plastic sheeting to wrap up the bodies of Vicky Hamilton and Dinah McNichol and to hide Angelika Kluk's; he was known to have previously used a knife to dismember victims such as with Hamilton; and McNichol's legs had been bound in a similar way to the unknown victim's. After Tobin's murder convictions, the body was exhumed in a failed attempt to identify the woman or the killer. Norfolk Police say there are no links between Tobin and Norfolk cases, and police are working on the theory that the woman was a sex worker nicknamed "The Duchess" who went missing in 1974.
 30 August 1974: Pamela Exall. 21-year-old Exall vanished after going for a late-night lone walk on a beach near Snettisham on 30 August 1974. Because Tobin holidayed in Norfolk, police contacted his former wives to attempt to establish when and where he had visited the area, but police found no links and have ruled out a connection to Exall's disappearance or any other case in Norfolk. It has been speculated that jewellery recovered from Tobin's possession by Operation Anagram is thought to be similar to that she was wearing when she disappeared. 
 30 March 1979: Yvette Anne Watson. 17-year-old Watson went missing from the David Rice Hospital mental health unit in Norwich where she was being treated for depression. She has not been seen since. In 2009, Norfolk Police said it had investigated the possibility Yvette may have been a victim of serial killer Peter Tobin, but found no links. However, excerpts from her diary include an entry on Monday 20 March 1978 - a year before she vanished - which made a reference to a 'Mr. Tobin'.
 26 February 1980: Elizabeth McCabe. 20-year-old McCabe was found strangled to death in Templeton Woods, Dundee. Her murder was included on a list of cases that investigative journalist Mark Williams-Thomas believed Tobin could not be ruled out from on a 2018 episode of his documentary series The Investigator: A British Crime Story. Her case, and that of 18-year-old Carol Lannen who was found dead only 150 yards from McCabe a year before, was investigated by police as part of an investigation into murders committed by Angus Sinclair.
 16 June 1980: Patricia "Patsy" Morris. 14-year-old Morris vanished during a lunch break from her school in Feltham and was later found strangled to death in bushes nearby. In 2011, there was media speculation that Morris's murder could be linked to Tobin, and Morris's father said he believed Tobin could be responsible. Although Morris's murder was reportedly re-investigated by Anagram, the case was subsequently linked to Levi Bellfield, as Morris was his childhood girlfriend at the time and he allegedly confessed to her murder in 2008.
 4 November 1981: Pamela Hastie. 16-year-old Hastie's bludgeoned and strangled body was found in Rannoch Woods in Johnstone, Renfrewshire, in November 1981. As she made her way through Rannoch Woods, near her home, Pamela's attacker strangled her with a length of twine after striking her on the head with a piece of wood and dragging her into bushes. Hastie had been raped. Links to Tobin were investigated as Johnstone was Tobin's birthplace. 
 11 September 1983: Janice Weston. At 9:00a.m. on Sunday 11 September 1983, the fully clothed body of an unidentified white female was found in a ditch adjacent to a lay-by on the northbound carriageway of the A1 road, south of the Brampton Hut roundabout in Cambridgeshire. The body, which had several head wounds caused by a blunt object, was identified as that of Janice Weston, a 36-year-old solicitor from London and partner of a well-established firm based at Lincoln's Inn in the city. She was last seen alive at her office there the previous day. Her bloodstained silver Alfa Romeo was found four days later in Camden Town, London.
 14 December 1991: Nicola Payne. 18-year-old mother of one, Payne disappeared while walking to her parents' house in Coventry. In 2010, there was media speculation that Tobin was responsible for Payne's presumed murder. Tobin was known to have spent time in Coventry in the early nineties when hiding with a religious sect while on the run from police. Investigative journalist Mark Williams-Thomas, who has been heavily involved in the Payne case, included Payne on a list of unsolved murders that he thought Tobin could not be ruled out from in a 2018 episode of his documentary series The Investigator: A British Crime Story, but subsequently stated that he does not believe that Tobin was responsible for her murder.
 30 July 1992: Helen Gorrie. 15-year-old Gorrie left her house at night to meet a man called 'John' and was later found murdered in a nearby community centre in Horndean. She had been strangled and smothered with her own clothing. Her murder was included on Williams-Thomas's list of cases he felt Tobin could not be ruled out. A man, John Corcoran, was jailed for her murder in 1999 after his business card was found in Gorrie's room, but his conviction was overturned in 2003. After his acquittal, police said they had no plans to re-open the murder investigation.
 22 January 2005: Jennifer Kiely. 35-year-old mother of three, Kiely, who suffered from mental health issues and who may have been homeless, was stabbed sixteen times and found burned in a beach shelter in Eastbourne in 2005. Tobin was linked to the case as he had connections to the town, but hospital records show that Tobin was being treated in a hospital in Paisley, Renfrewshire, in the days leading up to the murder and was only discharged on the day of the murder, which would appear to rule him out of the attack.

Bible John speculation

Tobin's convictions led to speculation in the late 2000s that he was Bible John, a serial killer who murdered three young women in Glasgow in the 1960s - Patricia Docker, 25, Jemima McDonald, 32, and Helen Puttock, 29. It had been alleged that Tobin reacted violently to his victims' menstruation, something which has long been suspected as the motive behind the Bible John murders. 

Tobin has since been eliminated as a suspect by police. Tobin moved from Glasgow to Brighton with his fiancée, Margaret Mountney, before the second murder attributed to Bible John. Operation Anagram found that Tobin was in Brighton at the time of the final two Bible John murders. He had married his first wife in Brighton on August 6, 1969, ten days before Bible John's August 16 murder of Jemima McDonald, as recorded on their marriage certificate. He was still living in Brighton at the time of the third murder, meaning he would have had to travel without his wife's knowledge to Glasgow and back from Brighton to have committed the murder of Helen Puttock, Bible John's third victim.

Although DNA had been used to rule out a previous suspect, detectives initally believed that a DNA link to Tobin would be unlikely due to a deterioration of the samples through poor storage. Tobin's DNA was ultimately checked against a semen stain on Puttock's tights as part of Operation Anagram which was the only remaining forensic evidence in the Bible John case. The results of this analysis ultimately proved the semen was not sourced from Tobin. The police also have a record of the bite mark that was found on Helen Puttock's body which they can cross-check with Tobin's dental records, as had been done with John McInnes when he was exhumed and subsequently eliminated as a suspect in 1996. Also, contemporary photos of Tobin showed he did not have red hair like Bible John was described to have had. Swindle has stated that there is no evidence to link Tobin to the Bible John murders, and Operation Anagram eventually discounted the theory.

Health and death
On 9 August 2012, Tobin was taken to Edinburgh Royal Infirmary after suffering chest pains and a suspected heart attack at HM Prison Edinburgh. At the same prison on 1 July 2015, he was slashed with a razor blade in his sleep, leaving a 20-centimetre scar running down his face and neck. His cellmate, 31-year-old double rapist Sean Moynihan, pleaded guilty to the attack in October, and was sentenced to 32 more months in prison.

In February 2016, Tobin was hospitalised again following a suspected stroke. In 2019 he was reported to be "frail" and suffering from cancer. He was taken to hospital again on 30 March 2022 and released two days later. Tobin died at Edinburgh Royal Infirmary on 8 October 2022, at the age of 76. On 16 October 2022, his ashes were scattered at sea after no relatives or next of kin claimed his body.

See also
 Alun Kyte – a similarly transient British killer of women
 List of serial killers in the United Kingdom
 List of serial killers by number of victims
 Murders of Jacqueline Ansell-Lamb and Barbara Mayo – two murders also previously linked to Tobin
 Operation Enigma – similarly-named police investigation that also covered the UK

Citations

General and cited sources 
 

1946 births
2022 deaths
1990s trials
1991 murders in the United Kingdom
1993 crimes in the United Kingdom
2000s trials
2006 murders in the United Kingdom
20th-century Scottish criminals
21st-century Scottish criminals
British people convicted of burglary
British prisoners sentenced to life imprisonment
Forgers
Male serial killers
Murder trials
People convicted of murder by England and Wales
People convicted of murder by Scotland
People from Johnstone
People with antisocial personality disorder
Prisoners and detainees of England and Wales
Prisoners sentenced to life imprisonment by Scotland
Prisoners who died in Scottish detention
Rape in Hampshire
Rape in the 1990s
Rape in the 2000s
Scottish murderers of children
Scottish people convicted of child sexual abuse
Scottish people convicted of murder
Scottish people convicted of rape
Scottish people who died in prison custody
Scottish serial killers
Sex crime trials
Trials in England
Trials in Scotland